Miss America 1945, the 19th Miss America pageant, was held at Boardwalk Hall in Atlantic City, New Jersey on September 8, 1945. Two days prior to the actual selection and coronation, the night of the talent competition, the Army Air Force Veterans voted the eventual winner, Miss New York City (Bess Myerson) as their favorite beauty queen.

Overview

Bess Myerson was the first Jewish-American and the first Miss New York (competing as Miss New York City, a competition organized by a local radio station) to win the Miss America Pageant as Miss America 1945. As the only Jewish contestant, Myerson was encouraged by the pageant directors to change her name to "Bess Meredith" or "Beth Merrick" but she refused. After winning the title (and as a Jewish Miss America), Myerson received few endorsements and later recalled that "I couldn't even stay in certain hotels [...] there would be signs that read no coloreds, no Jews, no dogs. I felt so rejected. Here I was chosen to represent American womanhood and then America treated me like this." She thus cut short her Miss America tour and instead traveled with the Anti-Defamation League. In this capacity, she spoke against discrimination in a talk entitled, "You Can't Be Beautiful and Hate."

Results

Placements

Awards

Preliminary awards

Other awards

Delegates
The Miss America 1945 delegates were:

References

External links
 Miss America 1945 - Miss America Organization
 Bess Myerson: Miss America 1945, Bess Myerson Dies At The Age Of 90 - CBS News, January 5, 2015.

1945
1945 in the United States
1945 in New Jersey
September 1945 events in the United States
Events in Atlantic City, New Jersey